In algebraic geometry, the Castelnuovo–Mumford regularity of a coherent sheaf F over projective space Pn  is the smallest integer r such that it is r-regular, meaning that

whenever i > 0. The regularity of a subscheme is defined to be the regularity of its sheaf of ideals. The regularity controls when the Hilbert function of the sheaf becomes a polynomial; more precisely dim H0(Pn, F(m)) is a polynomial in m when m is at least the regularity.
An r-regular sheaf is s-regular for any s ≥ r.
If a coherent sheaf is r-regular then   F(r) is generated by its global sections.

Graded modules
A related idea exists in commutative algebra.  Suppose R = k[x0,...,xn] is a polynomial ring over a field k and M is a finitely generated graded R-module.  Suppose M has a minimal graded free resolution

and let bj be the maximum of the degrees of the generators of Fj.  If r is an integer such that bj - j ≤ r for all j, then M is said to be r-regular.  The regularity of M is the smallest such r.

These two notions of regularity coincide when F is a coherent sheaf such that Ass(F) contains no closed points.  Then the graded module  is finitely generated and has the same regularity as F.

See also 

 Hilbert scheme
 Quot scheme

References

Algebraic geometry